The 1927–28 Rugby Union County Championship was the 35th edition of England's premier rugby union club competition at the time.

Yorkshire won the competition for the ninth time after defeating Cornwall in the final.

Final

See also
 English rugby union system
 Rugby union in England

References

Rugby Union County Championship
County Championship (rugby union) seasons